Ethnikos Piraeus B.C. is the basketball department of the Greek multi-sport club of Ethnikos Piraeus or Ethnikos OFPF (National Club of Fans of Piraeus and Phalerum). It is based in Piraeus, which is located in the Athens urban area, and its home is the Panagiotis Salpeas Gymnasium. In the current season, Ethnikos Piraeus plays in the second division of the Greek basketball league system. The team's colours are white and blue.

History
During the decade of the 1970s, Ethnikos played in the Beta Ethniki (second national league), and came close to reaching promotion to the top-tier level A Ethniki (first national league). The former president of FIBA Europe, George Vassilakopoulos, competed in Ethnikos Piraeus. In the subsequent following years, Ethnikos' standing as a club declined, and it played in the lower minor league Greek divisions.

In recent years, the club was promoted almost every year, as it climbed up to the Greek 2nd Division. Ethnikos was promoted 3 times, in 3 years (in 2012, 2013, and 2014). In 2014, Ethnikos was promoted to the Greek A2 Basket League (second division), after beating Livadeia in a one off playoff game.

Titles
Ethnikos has won the amateur level cup of the South Attica regional (ESKANA) 3 times.

The results of Ethnikos' 3 ESKANA local regional cup finals wins:
2009 : Ethnikos – Perama 66 – 62
2012 : Ethnikos – Milon 69 – 63 
2014 : Ethnikos – Proteas Voulas 83 – 77

Roster

Head coaches
 Georgios Kalafatakis

References

External links
Official website 
Eurobasket.com Team Page

Basketball teams in Piraeus
Ethnikos Piraeus